Povilas Čukinas (born 11 April 1983) is a Lithuanian professional basketball player.

Professional career 

Born  in Trakai, Čukinas started his career in LKAL's Puntukas Anykščiai. He moved to Alita Alytus of LKL. Although the player's statistics were not impressive (he averaged 3.8 points per game for Alita), then-LKL champion BC Lietuvos Rytas signed a long-term contract with the young forward. Čukinas played for Lietuvos Rytas for four consecutive years, but was used sparingly. His best season was the 2003-04 season, when Čukinas averaged 10.7 points per game.

During the 2006-07 season, Čukinas was loaned to Bundesliga's EnBW Ludwigsburg. He became one of the key players there. Later, he was invited to play for Serie A's Tisettanta Cantù.

On 24 September 2008 Barons LMT invited Čukinas into the team but he was waived only after a month of playing. Čukinas finished the season with BC Budivelnyk. On 25 August 2009 he signed a one-year contract with Žalgiris Kaunas.

On 17 September 2010 he was loaned to Aisčiai Kaunas. On 1 November 2011 he signed a one-year contract with Walter Tigers Tübingen. Since 9 October 2012 he has been playing for BC Prienai. In 2012, he signed with Sanaye Petrochimi Mahshahr BC.

References 

1983 births
Living people
BC Budivelnyk players
BC Rytas players
BC Žalgiris players
Lithuanian men's basketball players
Pallacanestro Cantù players
People from Trakai
Tigers Tübingen players
Centers (basketball)
Starwings Basel players